The Knowledge Engineering and Machine Learning group (KEMLg) is a research group belonging to the Technical University of Catalonia (UPC) – BarcelonaTech.  It was founded by Prof. Ulises Cortés. The group has been active in the Artificial Intelligence field since 1986.

The main goal of this research group is the analysis, design, implementation and application of several Artificial Intelligence techniques, to support the operation or behavior analysis of real-world complex systems or domains. Research is focused on the analysis, design, management or supervision of these domains, such as in the health and medical field, in environmental processes and systems, and in the industrial and enterprise sector.

Specific research efforts are undertaken in analysis and development of intelligent agents, understanding of coalition setting dynamics, social structure dynamics analysis, formal model construction for norms and conventions for e-commerce, temporal episode-based reasoning, information flow process design, experience-based argumentation techniques, hybrid methods in Statistics and Artificial Intelligence, belief or Bayesian networks, Case-based reasoning, knowledge-based systems, supervised and unsupervised machine learning techniques, knowledge model identification and knowledge model building, knowledge representation, ontologies, social networks, semantic Web, Web services, and directory service study.

One of the major areas of application expertise is in the development of Environmental Decision Support Systems (EDSS) using Artificial Intelligence Techniques. For example, research has been done since 1990 in the area of Urban Wastewater Treatment Plants (WWTP), and more specifically on those that have as a technological basis the activated sludge.

Research lines
Their main research lines include:

 Knowledge representation, ontologies, the semantic Web and Web services
 Recommendation systems
 Software agents, electronic institutions and Multi-agent systems
 Intelligent decision support systems
 Machine Learning/Knowledge Discovery and Data Mining
 Bayesian networks
 Case-based reasoning
 Knowledge-based systems
 Knowledge acquisition and Knowledge discovery from structural analysis
 Simulation and analytical models
 Assistive Technologies for the elders.  Intelligent assistive tools as the i-Walker have been developed.

Network memberships
These are the networks of excellence and thematic networks the group belongs to:
ATICA – Spanish Network for the Advance and Transfer of Applied Computational Intelligence (TIN2011-14083-E)
Data Mining and Machine Learning Spanish Network (TIC2002-11124-E)
KDNET – Knowledge Discovery Network of Excellence (IST-2001-33086)
Fluvial Basin Integral Management. Thematic network (2003/XT/00045)
Monitoring and Modelling as a Support Tools for the Improvement of Water Quality in Catalonia. Thematic network (1999/XT/0037, 2001/XT/00030, 2003/XT/0069)
MLNET, MLNET2 – Machine Learning Network of Excellence (ESPRIT 29288)
AgentLink, AgentLink II, AgentLink III – Network of Excellence for Agent-Based Computing (IST-1999-29003)
Artificial Intelligence in Catalonia. Thematic network (1996/XT/0031)

Awards

 Ulises Cortés: "Premio ESTYLF 2012". Recognizing 25 years working in fuzzy logic.
 Jorge Rodas: "Knowledge Discovery in repeated and very short serial measures with a blocking factor". 2002 Premio Chihuahua. Advisors: Dr. Karina Gibert & Dr. Emilio Rojo.
 Javier Vázquez:  "The role of norms and electronic institutions in multi-agent systems applied to complex domains the harmonia framework".  2003 ECCAI Artificial Intelligence Dissertation Award.  Advisor: Prof Ulises Cortés
 Cristina Urdiales: "CARMEN (Collaborative Autonomous Robot for Mobility ENhancement)".  2010 ECCAI Artificial Intelligence Dissertation Award. Also awarded with the VODAFONE SPAIN Foundation Award for Best Doctoral Thesis in ICT Accessibility and Personal Autonomy (2012). This award was given in the XXXII edition of Telecommunication Engineers Awards, organized by the Official Association of Telecommunication Engineers. Advisor: Prof Ulises Cortés
 Miquel Sànchez-Marrè: 
 Accesit of the Oms i De Prat 1991 Prize, granted by Caixa de Manresa, in the field of Experimental and Applied Sciences for the Master's Thesis entitled, DEPUR: an Application of Knowledge-Based Systems to Wastewater Treatment Plants Diagnosis (1991). 
 Elected Fellow of the International Environmental Modelling and Software society (iEMSs), 2005
 Karina Gibert: Elected Fellow of the International Environmental Modelling and Software society (iEMSs), 2007

Accreditations
 Consolidated Research Group – AGAUR (2009SGR 1365). Generalitat of Catalonia. From October 2009 to October 2012.
 Consolidated Research Group – AGAUR (2005SGR 0001). Generalitat of Catalonia. From May 2005 to May 2008.

References

External links
 Official website

Research institutes in Catalonia
Artificial intelligence associations
Science and technology in Catalonia
Education in Catalonia